The 1935–36 William & Mary Indians men's basketball team represented the College of William & Mary in intercollegiate basketball during the 1935–36 season. Under the second year of head coach Tom Dowler, the team finished the season with an 11–6 record. This was the 31st season of the collegiate basketball program at William & Mary, whose nickname is now the Tribe.

This was William & Mary's final season as an independent as they would become members of the Southern Conference the following season.

Schedule

|-
!colspan=9 style="background:#006400; color:#FFD700;"| Regular season

Source

References

William & Mary Tribe men's basketball seasons
William And Mary Indians
William and Mary Indians Men's Basketball Team
William and Mary Indians Men's Basketball Team